The Croatian men's national under 20 ice hockey team is the national under-20 ice hockey team in Croatia. The team represents Croatia at the International Ice Hockey Federation's World Junior Hockey Championship Division I.

Jun
Junior national ice hockey teams